Eva Fasel (born 1 September 1994) is a Liechtensteiner footballer who plays as a midfielder for Triesen and the Liechtenstein national football team.

Career statistics

International

International goals

References

1994 births
Living people
Women's association football midfielders
Liechtenstein women's international footballers
Liechtenstein women's footballers